Farroupilha is a city in Rio Grande do Sul, Brazil, in the Serra Gaúcha between the cities of Bento Gonçalves and Caxias do Sul.  The city's total area is 359.3 km2.  Farroupilha has 73,061 residents (2020 estimate).

Farroupilha hosts an annual Festa Nacional do Kiwi (National Kiwifruit Festival) known as Fenakiwi.
It is like the Festa da Uva in neighbor city Caxias do Sul,

History

The area of Farroupilha was first settled in 1875 by three families (Stefano Crippa, Tomazo Radaelli, and Luigi Sperafico) that immigrated from Milan, Italy.  The municipality of Farroupilha was officially created on 11 December 1934.  The city was named "Farroupilha" after the Centennial anniversary of the Ragamuffin War that was celebrated in the subsequent year.

Twin towns – sister cities

Farroupilha is twinned with:
 Cadaval, Portugal
 Latina, Italy

References

External links
Farroupilha City Hall (in Portuguese)
Kiwi Fest Fenakiwi (in Portuguese)

Municipalities in Rio Grande do Sul